This list of Uyghurs includes noted members of the Uyghur ethnic group who today live primarily in the Xinjiang Autonomous Region of northwest China.

Famous kings and historical figures 
Uyghur Khaganate and Qocho Kingdom

Kutlug Bilge Qaghan
Bayanchur Qaghan
Bogu Qaghan
Tun Baga Tarkhan
Kulug Bilge Qaghan
Qutluq Bilge Qaghan
Qutluq II Bilge Qaghan
Bayanchur Qaghan
Bogu Qaghan
Baurchuk Art Tekin
Baoyi Qaghan
Chongde Qaghan
Zhangxin Qaghan
Enian Qaghan
Uge Qaghan
Qasar Qaghan
Zhaoli Qaghan

Kara-khanids

 Oghulchak Khan
 Bazir Arslan Khan
 Musa Baytash Khan
 Ali Arslankhan
 Ali Tegin
 Böritigin
 Sultan Satuq Bughra Khan
 Bilge Kul Qadir Khan (840–893)
 Musa Bughra Khan 955–958
 Suleyman Arslan Khan 958–970
 Ahmad Arslan Qara Khan 998–1017, son of Ali Arslan
 Mansur Arslan Khan 1017–1024, son of Ali Arslan
 Muhammad Toghan Khan 1024–1026, son of Hasan b. Sulayman
 Yusuf Qadir Khan 1026–1032, son of Hasan b. Sulayman
 Ebu Shuca Sulayman 1034–1042
 Tamghach Khan Ibrahim (also known as Böritigin) c. 1040–1068
 Nasr Shams al-Mulk 1068–1080: married Aisha, daughter of Alp Arslan.
 Khidr 1080–1081
 Ahmad 1081–1089
 Ya'qub Qadir Khan 1089–1095
 Mas'ud 1095–1097
 Sulayman Qadir Tamghach 1097
 Mahmud Arslan Khan 1097–1099
 Jibrail Arslan Khan 1099–1102
 Muhammad Arslan Khan 1102–1129
 Nasr 1129
 Ahmad Qadir Khan 1129–1130
 Hasan Jalal ad-Dunya 1130–1132
 Ibrahim Rukn ad-Dunya 1132
 Mahmud 1132–1141
 Ibrahim Tabghach Khan 1141–1156
 Ali Chaghri Khan 1156–1161
 Mas'ud Tabghach Khan 1161–1171
 Muhammad Tabghach Khan 1171–1178
 Ibrahim Arslan Khan 1178–1204
 Uthman Ulugh Sultan 1204–1212
 Ebu Shuca Sulayman 1042–1056
 Muhammad bin Yusuph 1056–10579

 İbrahim bin Muhammad Khan 1057–1059
 Mahmud 1059–1075
 Umar (Kara-Khanid) 1075
 Ebu Ali el-Hasan 1075–1102
 Ahmad Khan 1102–1128
 İbrahim bin Ahmad 1128–1158
 Muhammad bin İbrahim 1158–?
 Yusuph bin Muhammad ?–1205
 Ebul Feth Muhammad 1205–1211

Moghulistan

Akhmad Alach also known as Ahmed, Khan of Turpan during the Ming Turpan Border Wars
Makhmud Khan
Tughlugh Timur
lyas Khoja
Qamar-ud-din Khan Dughlat
Khizr Khoja
Shams-i-Jahan
Muhammad Khan (Khan of Moghulistan)
Naqsh-i-Jahan
Awais Khan
Sher Muhammad
Awais Khan
Satuq Khan
Esen Buqa II
Mansur Khan Khan of Turpan during the Ming Turpan Border Wars
Sultan Said Khan
Yunus Khan also known as Ali, Khan of Turpan during the Ming Turpan Border Wars
Dost Muhammad
Appaq Khoja
Kebek Sultan

Yarkend Khanate
Abdurashid Khan (in Aksu 1521–1533) 1533–1560, son of Sultan Said Khan. Died in 1560 in the age of 52.
Abdul Karim Khan (Yarkand) 1560–1591, second son of Abdurashid Khan. Died in 1591 in the age of 63.
Muhammad Khan (in Turfan 1588–1591) 1591–1609, 5th son of Abdurashid Khan, in 1603 was visited in Yarkand by Portuguese Jesuit Bento de Gois, who was searching land ways from India to Ming China, headed trade mission on behalf of Moghul Emperor of India Akbar the Great and had a Letter of Safe Conduct, granted by Akbar and addressed to Muhammad Khan, with him. Died in 1609 in the age of 72.
Shudja ad-Din Ahmad Khan 1609–1618, son of Muhammad Khan, grandson of *Abdurashid Khan, was killed in 1618 during hunting.
Kuraysh Sultan 1618, son of Yunus Sultan, grandson of Abdurashid Khan, ruled only 9 days before he was killed.
Abd al-Latif (Afak) Khan 1618–1630, second son of Shudja ad-Din Ahmad Khan, who was only 13 when was set up on khanship, died in 1630 in the age of 25.
Sultan Ahmad Khan (Pulat Khan) (in Aksu 1617–1630, since age of 4) 1630–1633, first son of Timur Sultan, who was the first son of Shuja ad-Din Ahmad Khan and died in 1615.
Mahmud Sultan (Qilich Khan) 1633–1636, second son of Timur Sultan, died in the age of 22 when was poisoned in 1636 by Khoja Yahiya (died in 1646 in the age of 63), son of Khoja Ishak Wali (died in 1599 in the age of 94), founder of Ishakiyya branch of Nakshbandi Khojagan Sufi Order, followers of which were known as Kara Taghliks.
Sultan Ahmad Khan (Pulat Khan) 1636–1638, restored on khanship with help of Kara Taghlik leader Khoja Yahiya, who was granted village Guma near Khotan by Sultan Ahmad Khan, resigned in 1638 on demands of Kashgar and Yarkand emirs in favor of Abdullah Khan, died in 1640 in the age of 27.
Abdullah Khan (in Turfan 1634/5–1638/9) 1638–1669, the eldest son of Abduraim Khan, grandson of Abdurashid Khan. During his reign Baghistan in Ili River Valley of former Moghulistan ( with tomb of Tughluk Timur Khan, founder of Moghul Dynasty in 1347, in Almalik near Ghulja) was lost to Dzungar Khan Erdeni Batur (1634–1653) in 1651, who created Dzungar Khanate in 1634 under Choros nobility, after former Confederation of 4 Kalmyk tribes ( Khoit, Khoshut, Choros and Torghut ) collapsed in Dzungaria in 1628. Abdullah Khan was expelled by Kashgar and Yarkand Beks to India in 1669, where he was received by Moghul Emperor Aurangzeb, who arranged his Hajj to Mecca and provided all supplies, died on October 30, 1675 in India in the age of 67, buried in Agra.
Nur ad-Din Sultan ( in Aksu 1649–1667) 1667–1668 in Kashgar and Yengisar, the youngest son of Abdullah Khan, died in 1668 in the age of 31 due to heavy drinking, reigned one year with help of the Kara Yanchuks , mercenaries from Dzungars and Kyrgyz tribes, who were first recruited on service in Yarkand Khanate during last years of reigning of Abdullah Khan.
Ismail Khan (in Chalish 1666–1669, in Aksu 1669–1670) 1669, the 5th son of Abduraim Khan, grandson of Abdurashid Khan, disciple of Kara Taghlik leader Khoja Ubaidullah (Khoja Shadi), son of Khoja Yahiya, was declared a Khan in Aksu after Abdullah Khan fled to India.
YuIbars Khan ( In Kashgar 1638–1667, since age of 8) 1669–1670, the eldest son of Abdullah Khan, disciple of Ak Taghlik leader Khoja Mohammad Yusuf (son of Khoja Kalon who died in 1598 and was founder of Ishkiya branch of Nakshbandi Khojagan Sufi Order, followers of which were known as Aktaghliks) and his son Appak Khoja, during his reign positions of Ak Taghliks in Yarkand Khanate greatly increased, was killed in 1670 by Dzungar supporter Erka Bek, main controller of Dzungar Khan Sengge (1653–1671) in Yarkand, in the age of 40.
Abd al Latif Sultan 1670, son of Yulbars Khan, who was set up on khanship by Ak Taghliks, was killed in the same 1670 by Kara Taghliks with all other sons of Yulbars Khan.
Ismail Khan 1670–1678, restored on April 2, 1670 by Kara Taghliks, expelled Appak Khoja and his son Yahia Khoja from the country in 1670, in 1678 was captured by Dzungars in Yarkand ( they were invited into the country by Ak Taghlik leader Appak Khoja who used for this recommendation letter from 5th Dalai Lama with whom he met in exile), died in Ili River Valley ( Baghistan) in 1680 in the age of 56.
Abd ar-Rashid Khan II 1678–1682, the eldest son of Sultan Said Baba Khan, set up on khanship by Dzungar Galdan (1671–1697), who came to Yarkand with Appak Khoja and was rewarded by him with 4,000 pcs of fine clothes and 100,000 silver coins (tangas) for military help. In 1682, Abd ar-Rashid Khan II was sent to Ili under escort by Dzungars, who reacted on complaint of Appak.Khoja to Galdan against Abd ar-Rashid Khan II and again were generously rewarded by him. Abd ar-Rashid Khan II fled to Beijing with his son Sultan and surrendered to the Kangxi Emperor in 1696 after Galdan's collapse.
Muhammad Imin Khan 1682–1692 (1680–1682 in Chalish, 1682 in Turfan), second son of Sultan Said Baba Khan. After his oldest brother Abd ar-Rashid Khan II was expelled, Muhammad Imin Khan was recalled from Turpan and elected a Khan on a Kurultai of Kashgar and Yarkand Begs. Organized several expeditions against Dzungars. It caused no objections from Appak Khoja, who even married Muhammad Imin Khan's sister Khanum Padshah to save his already shaken prestige and influence among population. In 1692 Muhammad Imin Khan issued State Order (Yarlik ) about expelling Appak Khoja and his son Yahiya Khoja from Yarkent Khanate. In response, Appak Khoja swore to exterminate all descendants of Chengiz Khan in the country and collected troops of his disciples. In decisive battle near Kargilik in 1692 most Muhammad Imin Khan's troops deserted him and joined Khojas. Muhammad Amin Khan fled to the mountains where he was killed.
Yahiya Khoja (in Kashgar 1690–1692) 1692–1695, son of Appak Khoja, set up on khanship by Appak Khoja, killed in 1695 by Hanim Padsha.
Hanim Padsha (Khanum Padshah) 1695, sister of Muhammad Imin Khan, widow of Appak Khoja, was killed in 1695.
Muhammad Mumin Khan (Akbash Khan) 1695–1705, the youngest son of Sultan Said Baba Khan, great-grandson of Abdurashid Khan, disciple of Kara Taghliks, recalled Kara Taghlik leader Khoja Daniyal (died in 1735) from exile in Kashmir to resist Ak Taghliks and Dzungars, fled to India in 1705 under protection of Aurangzeb of Moghul Empire.

 Shah Khan 1543–1570, the eldest son of Mansur Khan

Koraish Sultan (Khotan 1533–1570; Chalish 1570–88) 1570–1588, son of Abdurashid Khan, expelled to India in 1588 by Abdul Karim Khan, where he was received by Moghul Emperor Akbar the Great, who gave him one of regions of India in suyurgal (inheritable possession of land with all peasants on it).
Muhammad Khan (in Kashgaria 1591–1610), 1588–1591, son of Abdurashid Khan
Abduraim Khan 1591–1594, 1605–1634, the youngest son of Abdurashid Khan, died in 1634 in the age of 77. Had 9 sons, eldest of them was Abdullah Khan.
Khudabende Sultan 1594–1605, son of Koraish Sultan, died in 1605

Muhammad Khashim Sultan (in Chalish) 1608–1610, son of Khudabende Sultan, grandson of Koraish Sultan, was killed in 1610 by Abduraim Khan in Kucha.
Abdullah Khan (in Chalish, in Kashgaria 1638–1669) 1634–1638, the eldest son of Abduraim Khan.
Abu'l Muhammad Khan 1638–1653, son of Abduraim Khan. In 1646 sent an embassy to Beijing to congratulate the newly proclaimed Manchu Shunzhi Emperor as first Emperor of the Qing dynasty of China, that succeeded the Ming dynasty, which was overthrown by Manchus in 1644. Embassy brought dozens of horses, camels and precision jade stones as a gift to the emperor. In accordance with ancient Chinese tradition it was declared as a Tribute from Vassal of China. In 1646 Turpan was granted by Qing China the rights to trade in the capital Beijing and in the city of Lanzhou, capital of Gansu province.
Sultan Said Baba Khan ( in Kumul 1636–1653) 1653, died in 1680 in the age of 53, 4th son of Abduraim Khan
Ibrahim Sultan ( in Khotan 1638–1653) 1653–1655, son of Abduraim Khan, was killed in 1655
Sultan Said Baba Khan (restored) 1655–1680. In 1656 sent an embassy to Qing China with gifts for the Shunzhi Emperor, who accepted them and issued an imperial order on October 19, 1656, concerning trade regulations with Turpan, and sent back with mission 338 pieces of silk garment and 723 rolls of fine silk as a gift to Turpan ruler.
Abd ar-Rashid Khan II (in Chalish 1678–1680) 1680–1682, the eldest son of Sultan Said Baba Khan, was captured in 1682 by Dzungars and held in captivity for 14 years, was rescued in 1696 by the Kangxi Emperor's Qing troops, who launched military operations against Dzungar Galdan Boshugtu Khan in Khalkha region and defeated him here in June 1696. Abdurashid Khan II was interrogated by Qings and gave them clues about Dzungar Khan's capture, explaining that he could to flee to Kukunor only through Turpan and Kumul, which supplied his troops with food. Qings contacted ruler of Kumul Ubaidullah Khan (?–1709), he captured son of Galdan Boshugtu Khan Tsewang Baljir, who came to Kumul for food, and handed over to Qings. Galdan Boshugtu Khan died of illness in 1697, his dead body was captured by Ubaidullah Khan as well and handed over to Qings. The Kangxi Emperor rewarded Abdurashid Khan II and Ubaidullah Khan for active participating in the operation for liquidating of Galdan Boshugtu Khan, Abdurashid Khan II was given permit to return to his homeland, while his son Sultan was retained in Beijing as actual hostage. Ubaidullah Khan was given the title of Jasak prince with his existing title of Tarkhan being confirmed (exemption from taxation and punishment until committing of 10th crime), the seal, imperial silk clothes and silver money, that was declared by Qings as incorporating of Kumul Khanate into Qing China. Son of Ubaidullah Khan Gapur Bek was appointed as assistant of Commander-in-chief of Qing troops in Suzhou, Gansu province, with permanent residence in this city that actually meant taking him as a hostage by Qings.
Muhammad Imin Khan 1682–1690, second son of Sultan Said Baba Khan, great-grandson of Abdurashid Khan. In 1682 sent an embassy to Qing China with gifts for the Kangxi Emperor. In his letter to the Kangxi Emperor, Muhammad Imin Khan apologized for delay of Tribute from Turpan, that was caused by recent turmoil in the country. The Kangxi Emperor accepted gifts and gave recommendation to replace horses for Jade in Tribute ( with compensation of 300 rolls of fine silk for 100 Tael (about 3.78 kg) of Jade). Embassy from Turpan was accompanied by Envoy from Kashgar Islam Khoja who informed the Kangxi Emperor of recent Dzungar invasion and asked some help against Galdan Boshugtu Khan, but result of negotiations is unknown

Kumul Khanate

 Yulbars Khan
 Maqsud Shah

Yettishar

 Yaqub Beg

Iliy Khanate

 Alahan Sultan
 Sadyr Palwan
 Gheni Batur

Other 
 Eretna
 Hala Bashi - a Uyghur General who served the Ming dynasty during the Miao Rebellions
 Iparhan 
 Rabban Bar Sauma
 Mar Yaballaha III
 Isma'il Beg
 Jakhangir Khoja

Republic of China politicians
Isa Yusuf Alptekin
Masud Sabri

First East Turkestan Republic
Sabit Damulla Abdulbaki
Abdullah Bughra
Mahmut Muhiti
Muhammad Amin Bughra
Nur Ahmad Jan Bughra
Isma'il Beg
Timur Beg
Islam Akhun
Khoja Niyaz

Second East Turkestan Republic

Abdulkerim Abbas
Ehmetjan Qasim
Gheni Batur

People's Republic of China politicians
Zulfiya Abdiqadir
Abdul'ahat Abdulrixit
Abdurehim Haji Amin
Burhan Shahidi
Ismail Tiliwaldi
Mahinur Qasim
Nur Bekri
Rashida (Chinese politician)
Saifuddin Azizi
Shohrat Zakir
Tömür Dawamat
Abdurehim Amet
Erkinjan Turahun
Menglik Siyit
Memtimin Qadir
Neyim Yasin
Sattar Sawut

Business 
Alijan Ibragimov, Kazakh businessman and former billionaire
Alimzhan Tokhtakhunov Businessman from Uzbekistan, billionaire
Kamil Ekim Alptekin, Turkish billionaire
Mutallip Hajim
Iminjan Rehmetulla, Uyghur Billionaire, he has "Grand-Bazaar" in Urumchi, "Bughra"

Politics (abroad)
Nury Turkel, American politician
Karim Massimov, Kazakh politician
Hedayat Amin Arsala, Afghan politician
Ali Sher Hyderi, Pakistani politician
Sadia Rashid, Pakistani politician

 Elders
Tata-tonga, Mongolian Uyghur. Writer of chingiz-khan
Yuldash Akhunbabaev, Uzbek politician
Ismail Yusupov

Writers, poets
Mahmud al-Kashgari
Yusuf Balasaghuni (Yusuf Has Hajip)
Ali-Shir Nava'i
Ahmad Yasawi
Mirza Muhammad Haidar Dughlat
Al-farabi
Ahmad Yugnaki
Turghun Almas
Kahar Barat, historian
Jian Bozan
Durnyam Mashurova
Lutpulla Mutellip
Abdurehim Ötkür
Zordun Sabir
Ziya Samedi
Musa Sayrami, historian
Tohti Tunyaz
Abduxaliq Uyghur
Nurmemet Yasin
Nur Luke
Zunun Kadir
Ghulam Osman Yaghma
Ahmatjan Osman
Mahmud Sadiq Kashgari, historian
Qidirkhan Yarkandi
Mahmud Sadir Kashgari, historian
Mahmud Kutlukov, soviet historian
Shah Mahmud Churas, historian

Military
Dadash Babazhanov, Hero of the Soviet Union
Masim Yakobov, Hero of the Soviet Union

Independence leaders
Abdulehed Nur
Ghulam Osman Yaghma
Salih Hudayar
Anwar Yusuf Turani

Scientists
 Shoukhrat Mitalipov, American scientist
 Maya Mitalipova, American scientist, sister of Shouhrat 
 Hushur Islam, computer scientist and academician of the Chinese Academy of Engineering
 Idris Hasan, computer engineer and activist
Ilham Tohti
Ibrahim Muti'i
Tashpolat Tiyip
Hakeem Muhammad Saeed,Pakistani medical researcher
Hakim Abdul Hameed,Indian medical researcher
Rahile Dawut
Lekim Ibragimov

Musicians
Quddus Khojamyarov
Erkin Abdulla, Uyghur-American singer
Abdulla Abdurehim
Dilnaz Akhmadieva
Amannisa Khan
Abdurahim Hamidov, Uzbek musician
Dilber
Omar Akhun
Murat Nasyrov
Turdi Akhun
Shuhrat Razzaqov
Haj Ghorban Soleimani
Sanubar Tursun
Benjamin Yusupov, Uyghur mother
Omar Akram
Ablajan Awut Ayup
Aziz Ibrahim
Yulduz Usmonova, Uzbek singer, Uyghur father
Perhat Khaliq (帕尔哈提) 
 Curley G (希林娜依·高)
 Newqiran Yüsüp, Uyghur rapper

Television hosts
Nëghmet Raxman

Actors
Dilraba Dilmurat (迪丽热巴, Dilireba)
Gülnezer Bextiyar (古力娜扎, Gulinazha)
Madina Memet (麦迪娜, Maidina)
Merxat Yalkun (米热, Mire)
Hankiz Omar (哈妮克孜, Hanikezi)
 Kurban Tulum, Model worker

Sportspeople
 Basketball players
Adiljan Jun, retired professional basketball player
Abudushalamu Abudurexiti, professional basketball player
Shirelijan Muxtar, professional basketball player
Adiljan Suleyman, Chinese basketballer

 Footballers
Ilzat Akhmetov, Kyrgyz Russian professional football player, midfielder of the Russian national football team
Dzhamaldin Khodzhaniyazov, Turkmen-Russian professional football player
Bari Mohamedali, Chinese footballer, Qingdao F.C.
Mirahmetjan Muzepper, Chinese footballer, Shanghai Port F.C.
Bughrahan Skandar, Chinese footballer, Guangzhou F.C.
Khojiakbar Alijonov, Uzbek professional football player of Pahtakor
Nematjan Zakirov, Kyrgyz football coach
Akmal Bakhtiyarov, Kazakh footballer
Tohtaji Ablikim, Chinese footballer
Memet-Abdulla Ezmat, Chinese footballer
Dilmurat Batur, Chinese footballer
Haliq Abraham, Chinese footballer
Ilhamjan Iminjan, Chinese footballer
Ruslan Baltiyev, former Kazakh footballer
Shirmemet Ali, Chinese footballer
Nizamdin Ependi, Chinese footballer
Abdurasul Abudulam, Chinese footballer
Anwar Memet-Ali, Chinese footballer
Mirza'ekber Alimjan, Chinese footballer
Ötkür Hesen, Chinese footballer
Shewket Yalqun, Chinese footballer
Eniwar Ekremjan, Chinese footballer
Salajidin Akramjan, Chinese footballer
Abduhamit Abdugheni-Chinese footballer
Dilmurat Mawlanyaz-Chinese footballer
Yehya Ablikim-Chinese footballer
Abduwali Ablet-Chinese footballer
Rahimjan Ekber-Chinese footballer
Exmetjan Ekber-Chinese footballer
Mijit Arapat-Chinese footballer
Abdulla Abduwal-Chinese footballer
Danyar Musajan-Chinese footballer
Minem Mehmudjan-Chinese footballer
Mehmud Abdukerem-Chinese footballer
Mustahan Mijit-Chinese footballer
Dilxat Ablimit-Chinese footballer
Bebet Murat-Chinese footballer
Kurban Ibrahim-Chinese footballer
Elizat Abdureshit-Chinese footballer
Muhamet Ghopur-Chinese footballer
Elbug Chagtsel-Chinese footballer
Rahimjan Ekber-Chinese footballer
Behtiyar Memetimin-Chinese footballer
Ilyas Ilhar-Chinese footballer

 Olympians
Mehmet Tursun Chong, Chinese olympic boxer
Dinigeer Yilamujiang, Chinese cross-country skier, last torchbearer at the 2022 Winter Olympics

 Others
Adili Hushur, Chinese tightrope walker
Rouzi Memet, professional snooker player
Paliha, Chinese wrestler

Religious
Abdulreqep Tömurniyaz
Imam Dc.Ayatollah
Imam Abbas Muhammad
Imam Qeshqerli
Imam Abdurehim Amin
Imam Nurmuhammad Iminov
Imam Asim
Imam Abidin Ayub
Imam Muhammad Salih Hajem
Imam Abdul Ahad Mehsum
Imam Hüseymin
Memet Jume
Saxis Mirza
Imam Ahmet Methiyaz
Imam Abduweli Ayup
Imam Muhemmedeli Tursun
Imam Qember Ember
Imam Iminjan
Sheyh Mahmud Muhammad
Qurban Mamut
Abdulqader Jalaledin
Nurjan Hapiz
Imam Alim Qari
Imam Memet Qari
Imam Qeyumahun Qari
Imam Qari Hajim
Tahir Hamut
Ablajan Bekri
Huseyincan Celil, Uyghur Imam in Canada
Abdur Rahman Kashgarhi of Bangladesh
Mukarram Ahmad, Imam in India
Suliman Gani, Imam in Great Britain
Juma Teyir
ʽAbd al-Qadir Badayuni
Qutbuddin Bakhtiar Kaki
Abdul Halim Bukhari Bangladesh islamic scholar
Ubaidul Haq Bangladesh islamic scholar
Alimjan Yimit, jailed house church leader

Detainees in Guantanamo
Adel Abdulhehim
Dawut Abdurehim
Edham Mamet
Akhdar Qasem Basit
Abu Bakker Qassim
Arkin Mahmud
Yusef Abbas
Abd Al Sabr Abd Al Hamid Uthman
Abdu Supur
Abdul Sabour
Ahmed Adil
Ahnad Adil
Hassan Anvar
Abdul Razakah
Abdul Razak
Ahmad Tourson

Other
Ismail Semed, Uighur activist executed for possession of illegal firearms and explosives
Örkesh Dölet, activist
Sadik Ahmad Turkistani, opponent of the Taliban
Abdul Shakoor al-Turkistani
Abu Omar al-Turkistani
Abdul Haq
Rushan Abbas, American Uyghur activist
Rebiya Kadeer, Uyghur activist
Dolkun Isa, Uyghur activist

References